Sang Kar (also Romanized as Sang-e Kar; also known as Sangar) is a village in Aliabad-e Malek Rural District, in the Central District of Arsanjan County, Fars Province, Iran. At the 2006 census, its population was 220, in 51 families.

References 

Populated places in Arsanjan County